Queen Sibylla may refer to:
 Sibylla of Jerusalem (c. 1160–1190), queen regnant of Jerusalem
 Sibylla of Acerra (1153–1205), queen consort of Sicily
 Sibylla of Normandy (1092–1122), queen consort of Scotland
 Sibylla of Lusignan (1198 – c. 1230 or 1252), queen consort of Armenia

See also
 Sibylla (disambiguation)